Ram Charan (Hindi राम चरण; Uttar Pradesh, 1939) is an Indian-American business consultant, speaker, and writer resident in Dallas, Texas.

Career 
Charan has consulted for companies such as GE, KLM, Bank of America, Praxair and Jaypee Associates. He is the author of various books on business, including Talent Masters, Leaders At All Levels''', Leadership in the Era of Economic Uncertainty: The New Rules for Getting the Right Things Done in Difficult Times, Boards That Deliver, What The CEO Wants You To Know, Boards At Work, Every Business Is A Growth Business (with Noel Tichy), Profitable Growth Is Everyone's Business, Confronting Reality, Know How and Execution (with Larry Bossidy and Charles Burck), which was a best-seller.

Charan runs his business management consulting company under the name Charan Associates in Dallas, TX. Records show the company was established in 1981 and incorporated in Texas. Current estimates show this company has an annual revenue of $500,000 to $1 million and employs a staff of approximately 1 to 4. Charan sits on the board for Austin Industries, SSA & Company (formerly Six Sigma Academy), and TE Connectivity.

Charan partnered with Kevin R. Cope and Stephen M.R. Covey to form Acumen Learning. Acumen Learning and Ram Charan have an agreement to use the concepts in his book: "What the CEO Wants You to Know". Ram has helped to define and popularize the idea of business acumen being an essential leadership characteristic in management.

In November 2012, Dr. Ram Charan, along with Sadhguru Jaggi Vasudev guided Insight: the DNA of Success a leadership program bringing together, for the first time, the tools of professional and personal empowerment. Fortune magazine calls him 'the most influential consultant alive'. The 4-day program held at the Isha Yoga Center, saw 200 business leaders converge in an exploration that bridged spirituality and business.

Charan was elected a Fellow of the National Academy of Human Resources in 2000 and named a Distinguished Fellow in 2005.

 Awards 

 The Economic Times of India named Ram Charan Global Indian of the Year for 2010.

 References 

 Further reading 
 Ram Charan, 2009, Leadership in the Era of Economic Uncertainty: The New Rules for Getting the Right Things Done in Difficult Times, McGraw-Hill Professional. 

 Bibliography 
 The Talent Masters:Why Smart Leaders Put People Before Numbers (November 9, 2010)
 Owning Up: The 14 Questions Every Board Member Needs to Ask (April 13, 2009)
 Leadership in the Era of Economic Uncertainty: The New Rules for Getting the Right Things Done in Difficult Times (December 22, 2008)
 The Game-Changer: How You Can Drive Revenue and Profit Growth with Innovation (April 8, 2008)
 Know-How: The 8 Skills That Separate People Who Perform from Those Who Don't (2007)
 Leaders at All Levels: Deepening Your Talent Pool to Solve the Succession Crisis (December 21, 2007)
 What the Customer Wants You to Know (December 27, 2007)
 Boards That Deliver: Advancing Corporate Governance From Compliance to Competitive Advantage (2005)
 The Source of Success: Five Enduring Principles at the Heart of Real Leadership (2005)
 Confronting Reality: Doing What Matters to Get Things Right (2004)
 Profitable Growth Is Everyone's Business: 10 Tools You Can Use Monday Morning (2004)
 Execution: The Discipline of Getting Things Done (2002)
 What the CEO Wants You to Know : How Your Company Really Works (2001)
 The Leadership Pipeline: How to Build the Leadership Powered Company (2000)
 Every Business is a Growth Business: How Your Company Can Prosper Year After Year'' (2000)

External links 
 Official website

1939 births
American business writers
Boston University faculty
Business speakers
Harvard Business School alumni
Indian emigrants to the United States
Living people
American people of Indian descent
American businesspeople